Robert John Pankhurst is a British geologist who has contributed to the study of the evolution and plate tectonics of Antarctica and South America. He has been a member of the Chilean Academy of Science since 2004. and the National Academy of Sciences of Argentina since 2005.

Robert (Bob) Pankhurst has authored or co-authored of hundreds scientific papers since 1970 and is a Visiting Research Associate at the British Geological Survey.

See also
Francisco Hervé
Carlos Washington Rapela
Víctor Alberto Ramos
Benjamin Bley de Brito Neves

References

British geologists
Tectonicists
Living people
Members of the Chilean Academy of Sciences
Alumni of the University of Oxford
1945 births